Milton Park, commonly known as the McGill Ghetto, is a neighbourhood in Montreal, Quebec, Canada. It is situated directly to the east of the McGill University campus in the borough of Plateau-Mont-Royal. It is named after the neighbourhood's two main streets, Milton Street and Park Avenue. Many McGill students live in this area, which is characterized by a mix of rowhouses and low- to mid-rise apartment buildings. The area is roughly bordered by University Street and the university campus to the west, Sherbrooke Street to the south, Pine Avenue to the north, and Park Avenue and the Lower Plateau neighborhood to the east, though McGill University considers this area to extend as far east as Saint Laurent Boulevard or just short of Saint-Louis Square.

The neighbourhood has many historic townhouses built in the late 19th century, which housed affluent businessmen and their families. The area remained a wealthy enclave throughout the early half of the 20th century. Eventually, many of the affluent residents of the area moved to other boroughs such as Westmount or to the suburbs.

While the space is colloquially known as the "Ghetto", the name for the area is used with the original definition of the word "ghetto": an inner-city neighborhood segregated from the rest of the population. 
The McGill Ghetto's population mostly consists of monolingual students coming from other Canadian provinces and English speaking foreign students who tend to stay in the "Ghetto" and avoid mixing with the local francophone population. The word "ghetto" is thus used ironically because this area is not segregated due to economic pressure but because its population chooses to isolate itself from the rest of the city due to cultural and linguistic barriers. There is a movement against this nomenclature because it suggests that the area is completely inhabited by extra-provincial anglophone students, while it is also home to many families, working professionals and long-term residents. Montreal's historic Jewish "Ghetto" coincides in part with the present student Ghetto, meeting at the intersection of Duluth and Saint Laurent.

The area has many small businesses catering to the needs of the local McGill community including The Word Bookstore, Café Lola Rosa, and several small convenience stores, as well as many "third place" hangouts.

Development and preservation

In the 1970s, community activists were concerned that the vast La Cité mixed-use complex (consisting of apartments, offices, a mall, and a hotel - now McGill's New Residence) would destroy the neighbourhood's character. A campaign to stop further redevelopment was led by a residents' coalition and the then-newly formed historic preservation group Heritage Montreal.

When McGill University acquired the hotel component of La Cité (at Park and Prince Arthur) and transformed it into an undergraduate student residence (called New Residence Hall), the student population in Milton Park increased by 650 people. La Cité also has a gym Club La Cité with an outdoor pool open year long and crosstraining facilities.  In 2009, McGill University purchased a second hotel (Four-Points on Sherbrooke) and transformed it into another student residence for use starting in the 2009-2010 school year.

Exhibitions 

 Milton-Parc: How We Did It, Canadian Centre for Architecture, Montreal (2019)
Les Jardins des femmes, Peter Gou-hua Fu School of Architecture, Montreal (2019)

See also
Student ghetto
Le Plateau-Mont-Royal

References

Further reading

External links

Finding aid for the Milton Parc fonds, Canadian Centre for Architecture.
Illuminated from Within: The Notman Garden series

Neighbourhoods in Montreal
McGill University
Student quarters
Historic Jewish communities in Canada
Jews and Judaism in Montreal
Le Plateau-Mont-Royal